Fuji is a method of "planchette writing", or "spirit writing", that uses a suspended sieve or tray to guide a stick which writes Chinese characters in sand or incense ashes.

Development
Beginning around the Ming dynasty (1368-1644 CE), the fuji method and written characters changed from  "support the sieve" (spirit-writing using a suspended sieve or winnowing tray) to   "support the planchette" (directing a stick or stylus, typically made from a willow or peach branch, and roughly resembling a dowsing-rod).

Vocabulary
Chinese fuji spirit-writing involves some specialized vocabulary. The fuji process involves specialized participants. The two people (or rarely one) who hold the sieve or stylus are called  ("planchette hands"), only one of whom is ostensibly possessed by a shen ("spirit; god") or xian ("immortal; transcendent"). Jiwen ("planchette writing") is a general reference to texts produced through Chinese fuji spirit-writing.

Folk history
Spirit-writing has a long history in Chinese folk religion, and is first recorded (Chao 1942:12) during the Liu Song dynasty (420-479 CE). Fuji planchette-writing became popular during the Song dynasty (960-1279), when authors like Shen Kuo and Su Shi associated its origins with summoning Zigu ("Purple Maiden"), the Spirit of the Latrine. Fuji divination flourished during the Ming dynasty, and the Jiajing Emperor (r. 1522–1566) built a special jitan ("planchette altar") in the Forbidden City (Despeux 2007:428). Although the practice of fuji planchette-writing was prohibited by the Qing dynasty (1644-1912) Legal Code, it has continued and is currently practiced at Daoist temples in Taiwan, Hong Kong, and Malaysia as well as folk shrines in Mainland China. Planchette writing is also mentioned in translations of the Golden Flower meditation manual that is used in modern practice in the United States as well.

Uses
Fuji is particularly associated with the Quanzhen School of Daoism. The Daozang "Daoist Canon" contains several scriptures supposedly written through spirit-writing. Two examples are the Zitong dijun huashu ("Book of Transformations of the Divine Lord of Zitong").

See also
 Chinese fortune telling
 Chinese spiritual world concepts
Fenghuang
I Ching divination
Jiaobei
Kau chim
Kokkuri
Omikuji
Ouija
Poe divination
Thoughtography
Tongji – medium or oracle in Chinese folk religion
Tung Shing – Chinese divination guide and almanac
The Secret of the Golden Flower

References

Further reading
de Groot, J.J.M. 1910. "Spirit-Writing, and other Oracular Work", in The Religious System of China, 6:1295-1316, E.J. Brill. 
Wilhelm, Richard. 1931. The Secret of the Golden Flower: A Chinese Book of Life. Harcourt Brace.
Jordan, David K. and Daniel L. Overmyer. 1986. The Flying Phoenix: Aspects of Chinese Sectarianism in Taiwan. Princeton University Press.
Russel, Terence C. 1990. "Chen Tuan at Mount Huangbo: A Spirit-writing Cult in Late Ming China", Asiatische Studien/Études Asiatiques 44.1:107-140.
Kleeman, Terry F. 1994. A God's Own Tale: The Book of Transformations of Wenchang, the Divine Lord of Zitong. State University of New York Press.
Lang, Graeme and Lars Ragvald. 1998. "Spirit-writing and the Development of Chinese Cults", Sociology of Religion 59.4:309-328.
Clart, Phillip. 2003. "Moral Mediums: Spirit-Writing and the Cultural Construction of Chinese Spirit-Mediumship", Ethnologies 25.1:153-190.
Despeux, Catherine. 2007. "Fuji  planchette writing; spirit writing," in The Encyclopedia of Taoism, ed. Fabrizio Pregadio, Routledge, 428–429.

External links

Planchette writing (Fuji), Taoist Culture & Information Centre
Spirit-writing and Hakka Migration in Taiwan – A Case Study of the Canzan Tang  in Puli , Nantou  County, Paul R. Katz
Ancient Ouija Boards: Fact or Fiction?, Museum of Talking Boards
 , Fuji Altar at Kam Lan Koon , Hong Kong
 , Fuji Altar at Che Sui Khor, Malaysia

Chinese mythology
Taoist practices
Chinese culture
Chinese words and phrases
Mediumship
Eastern esotericism